A piece of puzzle jewelry is a puzzle which can be worn by a person as jewelry.

These puzzles can be both fully mechanically functional and aesthetically pleasing as pieces of wearable jewelry.

Examples of available puzzle jewelry
The following list implies that a small version of the cited puzzle is available with suitable design and finish to be worn as jewelry.
 Puzzle ring, often made in Turkey having four interconnected rings

See also
Puzzle box

References

Types of jewellery
Mechanical puzzles